Keziah Jones (born Olufemi Sanyaolu on 10 January 1968) is a Nigerian singer-songwriter and guitarist. He describes his musical style as "Blufunk", which is a fusion between raw blues elements and hard, edgy funk rhythms. Also his Nigerian roots in Yoruba music and soul music can be considered a major influence on his sound.

He is known for his distinctive style of guitar playing, including his percussive right-hand technique which is similar to a bass guitarist's slapping technique.

Life and career 
Olufemi Sanyaolu a.k.a. Keziah Jones is the son of Oshodolamu Sanyaolu; Chief of the Yoruba people and successful industrialist and Abiola Sanyaolu. Born on 10 January 1968, Jones spent his early childhood in a large family in a part of Nigeria in the city of Lagos. From a young age he was being prepared to follow his father's footsteps in the family concern and was expected to have an academic career. Therefore, his father enrolled him in a Public School in London and he left Nigeria at the age of eight to be educated in England.

"I had to find a way out of all that, and music was it!" By the age of 13 he had discovered the old school piano and taught himself how to play and write songs. Three years later he switched to the guitar, increasingly neglecting his studies. After scraping through exams he went against his father's wishes and family tradition even more by skipping school and busking in the streets, clubs and London Underground, constantly avoiding the police.

Jones led a bohemian lifestyle for several years instead of the one envisaged for him. "Lose all time, love your mind, free your soul!" were words from his song Free Your Soul. Moving from London to Paris and back again frequently accompanied only by his guitar, the young Jones acquired a reputation as a talented musician and charismatic performer with a unique "hard funk" style. In 1990, whilst busking in London's Portobello Road, Keziah was discovered by composer and ex-keyboard player for Sailor and Culture Club, Phil Pickett quickly evolving into full-time management of the artist.
Pickett signed Jones to a long-term songwriting agreement with Hit & Run Music Publishing (photo Billboard 1990) whose executive, Dave Massey, had recorded songs by Jones when at Chrysalis Music. Massey continued to be involved in Keziah's career for the next 8 years. After a brief but near disastrous flirtation with Capitol Records in the US, in 1992, Pickett signed Keziah to Emmanuel de Buretel's Delabel label for his debut album Blufunk Is a Fact. Recording in London with producer Kevin Armstrong, included in the worldwide success of the project was Keziah's first single "Rhythm Is Love". Jones attributes his Parisian subway experiences as highly instrumental to his by now blossoming career in his official biography. By 2008, Jones had recorded five albums and one live DVD. After performing many shows and festivals throughout the world between 2009 and 2012, late in 2012 Keziah Jones was back in Lagos preparing to record his new studio album set for worldwide release on Because Music in 2013

Influences 
Keziah often cites Fela Kuti, Miles Davis and Jimi Hendrix as important influences.

Art 
Keziah Jones also draws, paints and writes poetry. He is a photographer and has produced short films, including one entitled BLACKSPEEDTEXT This film, his music and the other facets of his artistic life reflect his experiences on the streets.

Personal life 
Keziah was married to Anglo-Nigerian singer Akure Wall in 1994.
They separated in 1996.

On 14 January 2012 Keziah married Hauwa Mukan, they separated in December 2013.

Discography

Studio albums

Compilation albums

EPs
 Frinigrô Interstellar (1991)
 Live (1993)
 The African Anarchist (1999)

Videography
Live at the Elysée Montmartre (14 June 2004)

Singles

Filmography 
 Eva & Leon (2015)

References

External links 

Official Site
Official Biography
MySpace Official Page
Keziah Jones studio performance: Lagos vs. New York, HD on BBCAfrica's YouTube Channel, 13 August 2009, retrieved 20, 10 March
A very extensive collection site!
Video-Interview and Photo Gallery
Artist Portrait by Keziah's Label
Video-Interview at Caprices Festival
HD Video of Keziah Jones performance in Paris Subway at Montparnasse on September 4, 2008

Nigerian singer-songwriters
Nigerian guitarists
20th-century Nigerian male singers
Nigerian buskers
Musicians from Lagos
Living people
1968 births
Yoruba musicians
20th-century guitarists
Because Music artists